Algoma District is a district and census division in Northeastern Ontario in the Canadian province of Ontario.

The name was created by an American  ethnologist, Henry Rowe Schoolcraft (1793-1864), who was appointed Indian agent to the Ojibwe in Sault Ste. Marie region in 1822.  "Al" is derived from Algonquin, while "goma" is a variant of gomee, meaning lake or water.

Algoma District has shoreline along Lake Superior and Lake Huron. It has an international border crossing to the American state of Michigan, at Sault Ste. Marie. Historically, it was known for its lumber and mining industries.

The rugged scenery of the region has inspired works by Canadian artists, particularly the Group of Seven. They rented a boxcar from the Algoma Central Railway to travel on excursions through this region.

History

Surviving prehistoric remains in Algoma District are concentrated around waterways. These remains date as far back as the Archaic period. There are also sites from the later Woodland period, with evidence of extensive Late Woodland habitation. Ceramics at Late Woodland sites show predominantly southeastern links, having originated from the Huron–Petun complex (broadly Ontario Iroquoian) as well as from modern-day Michigan.

French explorers arrived in the area by the mid-17th century. As the French penetrated into North America, they established lines of forts and trading posts, often at river mouths to control trade, especially the lucrative fur trade. In Algoma, they established Fort Michipicoten, located at the mouth of the Michipicoten River where it empties into Lake Superior. The Michipicoten was one of the geographic features depicted by Samuel de Champlain on a 1632 map. This helped the French bridge the distance to Fort Kaministiquia at the head of Lake Superior, and protected the route up the Michipicoten to James Bay, providing a significant crossroads of water routes.

Administrative history
Algoma was created by proclamation in 1858 as a provisional judicial district of the Province of Canada comprising territory north of the French River as far west as Pigeon River, including all Canadian islands in Lakes Huron and Superior. The authorizing act of the Legislative Assembly of the Province of Canada was An Act to provide for the Administration of Justice in the unorganized Tracts of Country within the limits of this Province (known by its short title as The Temporary Judicial Districts Act, 1857).

The district seat has been Sault Ste. Marie since 1858.

As the population grew and the northern and northwestern boundaries of Ontario were determined by the Judicial Committee of the Privy Council, Algoma shrank. Other districts were created from it by the provincial government of Ontario:
Thunder Bay District in 1871
Manitoulin District in 1888
Sudbury District in 1894
Timiskaming District in 1912

Geography

Rivers

Algoma District is crossed by a number of rivers, which historically were used as transportation and trade corridors. The Hudson's Bay Company chose key riverside or river mouth locations for a number of its trading posts in the district. One example was Fort Michipicoten, located at the Michipicoten River's mouth. The rivers flow in a number of directions, some crossing through other districts to ultimately empty into faraway water bodies such as James Bay. Others drain into the Great Lakes Basin via Lake Huron or Lake Superior.

Major rivers in Algoma District include:
 Batchawana River (empties into Batchawana Bay on Lake Superior)
 Michipicoten River (empties into Michipicoten Bay on Lake Superior)
 Missinaibi River (originates at Missinaibi Lake and empties into the Moose River, then ultimately into James Bay)
 Mississagi River (originates in Sudbury District and flows into Lake Huron)
 Kapuskasing River (begins at Kapuskasing Lake and flows northward to James Bay)

Forests

In the Algoma section, the characteristic forest mixture consists of yellow birch, white spruce, balsam fir, sugar maple, hop-hornbeam, and eastern white cedar. Eastern white pine and occasional red pine (Pinus resinosa) dominate on the upper, steep south-facing slopes; white spruce, eastern white cedar, and balsam fir occupy the middle and lower slopes. A white spruce–balsam fir association, which usually includes white birch and black spruce, is prominent on the river terraces and adjoining flats in the northern part of the Section (Rowe 1972).

Subdivisions
Communities within these subdivisions are added in parentheses.

Cities

Towns

Townships

Villages

Reserves

Unorganized areas
 North Part (incl. local services boards of Aweres, Batchawana Bay, Goulais and District, Hawk Junction, Missanabie, Peace Tree, Searchmont and Wharncliffe and Kynoch)
 South East Part

Demographics

Highways

King's Highways
 #17
 #101
 #108
 #129

Secondary highways

 #519
 #532
 #538
 #546
 #547
 #548
 #550
 #552
 #553
 #554

 #556
 #557
 #563
 #565
 #631
 #638
 #639
 #651
 #670

Tertiary highways
 #821

Protected areas

 Algoma Headwaters Provincial Park
 Aubinadong River Provincial Park
 Aubrey Falls Provincial Park
 Batchawana Bay Provincial Park
 Batchawana River Provincial Park
 Chapleau Crown Game Preserve
 Chapleau-Nemegosenda River Provincial Park
 Delta Provincial Nature Reserve
 Fort Creek Conservation Area
 Goulais River Provincial Park
 Hiawatha Highlands Conservation Area
 La Cloche Provincial Park
 Lake Superior Provincial Park
 Little White River Provincial Park
 Marks Bay Conservation Area
 Matintenda Provincial Park
 Michipicoten Post Provincial Park
 Missinaibi Provincial Park
 Mississagi Provincial Park

 Mississagi River Provincial Park
 Montreal River Provincial Park
 Nagagami Lake Provincial Park
 Nagagamisis Provincial Park
 Nemegosenda River Wetlands Provincial Park
 North Channel Islands-La Cloche Provincial Park
 North Shore Waterwat Provincial Park
 Obatanga Provincial Park
 Pancake Bay Provincial Park
 Pichogen River Provincial Nature Reserve
 Pokei Lake-White River Wetlands Provivncial Nature Reserve
 Potholes Provincial Nature Reserve
 Pukaskwa National Park
 River aux Sables Provincial Park
 Sandy Islands Provincial Nature Reserve
 Sayme-Aubinadong-Gong Provincial Park
 St. Joseph's Island National Marine Bird Sanctuary
 Wenebegon River Provincial Park

Attractions
 Algoma Central Railway - Agawa Canyon (Algoma, Unorganized, North Part)
 Algoma University (Sault Ste. Marie)
 Fire Tower Lookout (Elliot Lake)
 Fort St. Joseph National Historic Site (St. Joseph)
 High Falls of the Michipicoten River (Wawa)
 Mount Dufour Ski Resort (Elliot Lake)
 Sault Ste. Marie Airport (Sault Ste. Marie)
 Sault Ste. Marie Canal (Sault Ste. Marie)
 Sault College (Sault Ste. Marie)
 Searchmont Ski Area
 Stone Ridge Golf Resort (Elliot Lake)
 Crimson Ridge Golf Course
 Batchawana Bay Provincial Park
 Hub Trail (hiking, bicycling, and cross-country ski trail through Sault Ste. Marie)
 Rocking On The River (Wandering-Elk Promotion & Productions), Concert Venue @ 135 Royer Rd., Blind River.

See also
List of townships in Ontario
List of secondary schools in Ontario

References

Further reading

External links

Algoma District's Historic Bridges
 Ontario's Algoma Country